St. Stephens is an unincorporated community in Fremont County, Wyoming, United States. It is home to the St. Stephens Indian Mission.

In Summer 2015, St. Stephens hosted an Arapaho language camp.

Education
St. Stephens Indian School, a K-12 tribal school affiliated with the Bureau of Indian Education, is in St. Stephens.

Notable person
Constantine Scollen, the famous missionary, was a priest here amongst the Arapaho from 1890 to 1892.

References

Unincorporated communities in Fremont County, Wyoming
Unincorporated communities in Wyoming
1884 establishments in Wyoming Territory